Craig Michael Faulconbridge (born 20 April 1978) is an English professional footballer.

Career
Born in Nuneaton, Faulconbridge played youth football with Coventry City, before playing league football for Dunfermline Athletic, Hull City, Wrexham and Wycombe Wanderers.

Faulconbridge notably scored a dramatic goal during the 1997–98 Scottish Premier Division season for Dunfermline against Celtic, a goal which denied Celtic the league championship that weekend. Celtic eventually clinched the championship, which denied Rangers a tenth successive championship, on the final day of the season by beating St Johnstone 2–0.

He later played non-league football with Wingate & Finchley, Maidenhead United, Oxford City, Carshalton Athletic and Woking, before joining Didcot Town as a player-coach in June 2011. He left in October 2011 after the resignation of Manager Francis Vines.

He signed for Aylesbury on 10 January 2012. After the conclusion of the season, Faulconbridge was confirmed as the new manager at Aylesbury, replacing Steve Smith. In June 2012, Faulconbridge confirmed his intentions to continue playing whilst managing.

Faulconbridge left Aylesbury in the autumn of 2013, replaced by former Slough Town manager Steve Bateman. He played for Chinnor during the 2014–15 season before joining Thame United, where he became a youth team coach and manager of Thame Rangers.

References 

1978 births
Living people
English footballers
Coventry City F.C. players
Dunfermline Athletic F.C. players
Hull City A.F.C. players
Wrexham A.F.C. players
Wycombe Wanderers F.C. players
Oxford City F.C. players
English Football League players
Scottish Football League players
Scottish Premier League players
Wingate & Finchley F.C. players
Woking F.C. players
Carshalton Athletic F.C. players
Maidenhead United F.C. players
Aylesbury F.C. players
Chinnor F.C. players
Thame United F.C. players
English football managers
Aylesbury F.C. managers
Association football forwards